Glen Allyn is a rural locality in the Tablelands Region, Queensland, Australia. In the  Glen Allyn had a population of 157 people.

Geography 

History 
Glen Allyn State School opened on 1 September 1920 and closed on 1965.

In the  Glen Allyn had a population of 157 people.

Attractions 
The Nerada Tea plantation and factory are at 933 Glen Allyn Road. The company is Australian's largest tea producer.

Lamins Hill Lookout is on the Old Cairns Track off Topaz Road.

References 

Tablelands Region
Localities in Queensland